Dreamcatcher is a roller coaster in Bobbejaanland in Belgium. Originally opening in 1987 as Air Race, Dreamcatcher was designed and built by Vekoma. It was Europe's first suspended roller coaster.

Ride details
The track has a length of 1968 feet. After ascending the lift hill to a height of 82 feet, the track changes into a bending parcour before entering a triple downward helix that turns in a counterclockwise direction. The train exits into another descending helix, this time a double helix that turns in the clockwise direction, followed by the final brake run and return to the station.

In 2019 the ride was expanded with optional virtual reality glasses.

Air Race
The original roller coaster was called Air Race. The train had 6 little multicolored aeroplanes. In each plane four passengers could sit: 2 in the front row and 2 in the back row. This train was operational between 1987 and 2005. The track itself was painted in bright yellow

Dreamcatcher
In 2006, the theme of the ride was changed to match the style of the main Wild West theme of Bobbejaanland, and the name was changed to Dreamcatcher. The airplanes were replaced by a train which is also used on inverted roller coasters. The tracks were repainted in a reddish-brown rust colour.

References

External links
 Dreamcatcher at official website Bobbejaanland
 Offride view Air Race at YouTube
 Front view Dreamcatcher Ride at YouTube
 Offride view Dreamcatcher at YouTube

Steel roller coasters
Roller coasters manufactured by Vekoma
Roller coasters in Belgium